Mykhaylo Mykhaylovych Yakubovych (born 1986) is a translator and scholar of Islamic Studies from Ukraine. He received his PhD from the National University of Ostroh Academy where he worked as an Associate Professor and researcher in Islamic Studies. He later moved to Uni Freiburg, Germany. He conducted his research on the Medieval Islam during his fellowships in Poland (2008, 2009), Italy (2009, 2011), Saudi Arabia (2010) and United States (Princeton, Institute for Advanced Study, 2014). He published few books, numerous articles and translations in various scientific journals in Ukraine, Poland, Russia, Egypt, Saudi Arabia, Great Britain and Turkey ("Religion, State and Society", "Journal of Ottoman Studies", "Yearbook of Muslims in Europe" etc.). He completed the first full translation of the Qur’an into the Ukrainian language, approved for publishing by the King Fahd Glorious Qur’an Printing Complex (Madinah, Kingdom of Saudi Arabia) and released in 2013 (second edition: Kyiv, 2015). He is a member of the research projects on the reception of the Arabic culture in Poland (2013-2015, 2016-2018, Warsaw University).

Main academic interests 

Qur’anic Studies, Medieval and Contemporary Islamic Thought, History of Islam in Ukraine.

Books 

 The Qur'an: Ukrainian translation and commentaries by Mykhaylo Yakubovych. Madinah, 2013; Kiev, 2015.
 Islam in Ukraine (Vinnycia, 2016, in Ukrainian).
 Philosophical Thought of the Crimean Khanate (Kiev, 2016, in Ukrainian).

Some articles in English 
Mykhaylo Yakubovych. Islam in Ukraine (country report),  Yearbook of Muslims in Europe, Volume 7, Leiden: Brill, 2016.
 Mykhaylo Yakubovych. Jan Latosz (1539–1608) and His Natural Philosophy: reception of Arabic science in early modern Poland, Cultures in Motion. Studies in the Medieval and Early Modern Periods. Ed. by Adam Izdebski and Damian Jasiński, Kraków: Jagiellonian University Press, 2014.
 Mykhaylo Yakubovych. Ukrainian Translations of the Meanings of the Glorious Qur'an: Problems and Prospects
 Mykhaylo Yakubovych. Islam and Muslims in Contemporary Ukraine: Common Backgrounds, Different Images, Religion, State and Society, 2010, No. 3.
 A Cultural Significance of the Modern Islamic Exegetics for the Theory of Religious Tolerance.
 Mykhaylo Yakubovych. Prophethood as a Historical Necessity: Between The Islamic Traditionalism and The Eastern Neoplatonism, Studia Antyczne i Mediewistyczne, No. 7 [42], 2009, P. 57-43.
  Mykhaylo Yakubovych. Muhammad al-Aqkirmānı and his ‘ Iqd al-La’ālı: The Reception of Ibn Sınā in Early Modern Ottoman Empire.
 A Neglected Ottoman Sufi Treatise from 16th century: Mawāhib al-Rahman f bayān Marātib al-Akwān by Ibrāhim al-Qirimi.
 Post-Classical Islamic Philosophy in the Medieval Crimea.

Sources 
 Holy Qur’an to be Published Full in Ukrainian
 Profile on Academia.Edu

1986 births
Quran translators
Islamic studies scholars
Living people
Ukrainian orientalists